NCOIC may refer to:

 Non-Commissioned Officer in Charge, an individual in the enlisted ranks of a military unit who has limited command authority over others in the unit
 Network Centric Operations Industry Consortium, an international not-for-profit, chartered in the United States